Samoa competed at the 2020 Summer Olympics in Tokyo. Originally scheduled to take place from 24 July to 9 August 2020, the Games were postponed to 23 July to 8 August 2021, because of the COVID-19 pandemic. It was the nation's tenth consecutive appearance at the Summer Olympic Games, for four of which it competed under the name Western Samoa.

The Samoan government in July 2021 released an order which barred athletes based in Samoa to compete in the Olympics due to rising COVID-19 infections in Japan. This meant that only Samoan athletes based overseas could compete in the games.

Competitors
The following is the list of number of competitors in the Games.

Athletics

Samoan athletes further achieved the entry standards, either by qualifying time or by world ranking, in the following track and field events (up to a maximum of 3 athletes in each event):

Field events

Boxing 

Samoa entered two male boxers into the Olympic tournament for the first time since Beijing 2008. Marion Faustino Ah Tong (men's welterweight) and the reigning Pacific Games champion Ato Plodzicki-Faoagali (men's heavyweight) topped the list of eligible boxers from Asia and Oceania in their respective weight divisions to secure places on the Samoan team based on the IOC's Boxing Task Force Rankings.

Canoeing

Sprint
Samoan canoeists qualified boats in each of the following distances for the Games through the 2020 Oceania Championships in Penrith, New South Wales.

Qualification Legend: FA = Qualify to final A (medal); FB = Qualify to final B (non-medal)

Judo
 
Samoa qualified one judoka for the men's half-middleweight category (81 kg) at the Games. Peniamina Percival accepted a continental berth from Oceania as the nation's top-ranked judoka outside of direct qualifying position in the IJF World Ranking List of June 28, 2021.

Sailing

Samoan sailors qualified one boat in each of the following classes through the class-associated World Championships, and the continental regattas, marking the country's debut in the sport.

M = Medal race; EL = Eliminated – did not advance into the medal race

References

External links 

Nations at the 2020 Summer Olympics
2020
2021 in Samoan sport